Heteroponerinae is a subfamily of ants in the poneromorph subfamilies group containing three genera in one tribe. The subfamily was created in 2003 when Barry Bolton divided the Ponerinae subfamily into six subfamilies.

Genera
Heteroponerinae Bolton, 2003
Heteroponerini Bolton, 2003
 Acanthoponera Mayr, 1862
 Aulacopone Arnol'di, 1930
 Heteroponera Mayr, 1887

References

External links

 
Ant subfamilies
Taxa named by Barry Bolton